Ernesto Enrique Mastrángelo (born 5 July 1948 in Rufino) is an Argentine former football striker who played for both River Plate and Boca Juniors in Argentina. He also played international football for the Argentina national team

Mastrángelo (nicknamed Héber) started his career in 1968 with Atlanta. In 1972, he joined River Plate but he never won any titles during his time with the club. He joined Unión de Santa Fe in 1975, but in early 1976 he was signed by River Plate's eternal rivals Boca Juniors.

During his time with Boca, Mastrángelo scored 56 goals in 134 games in all competitions. He won a number of titles with the club including three league titles and two consecutive Copa Libertadores championships.

He was twice Boca's top scoring player, in 1977 and 1979, he retired in 1981 after the team won the Metropolitano championship.

Coaching career
After retiring as a player Mastrángelo has worked as a youth coach with clubs such as Boca Juniors and Chacarita Juniors and the Paraguay under-20 international team

Honours

Player
 Boca Juniors
Argentine Primera: Metropolitano 1976, Nacional 1976, Metropolitano 1981
Copa Libertadores: 1977, 1978
Copa Intercontinental: 1978

References

External links

 Short bio

1948 births
Living people
People from General López Department
Sportspeople from Santa Fe Province
Argentine people of Italian descent
Argentine footballers
Association football forwards
Club Atlético Atlanta footballers
Club Atlético River Plate footballers
Unión de Santa Fe footballers
Boca Juniors footballers
Argentine Primera División players
Argentina international footballers